The Ghost and Molly McGee is an American animated supernatural comedy television series created by Bill Motz and Bob Roth for Disney Channel. A sneak peek of the show's theme song was first shown on May 1, 2021, during the network's "Halfway to Halloween" event, followed by the show's premiere on October 1, 2021. On August 31, 2021, more than a month before it premiered, the series was renewed for a second season, which is set to premiere on April 1, 2023.

Plot
In the Human Realm, 13-year-old optimist Molly McGee arrives in her new hometown of Brighton, only to discover a grumpy ghost named Scratch haunting her new house. Scratch curses Molly in an attempt to scare her away; however, this backfires, forever binding him to her. After a rocky introduction to Molly's family, Scratch, and Molly form a tentative friendship. Shortly thereafter, in the Ghost Realm, the level of misery in Brighton decreases slightly; the Ghost Council's Chairman notices this.

While initially antagonistic toward her, Scratch opens up to Molly with time, and their friendship strengthens.

Characters

Main
 Molly McGee (voiced by Ashly Burch), an optimistic tween girl who lives to make the world a better place. She keeps Scratch a secret from anyone who isn't her family, and later Libby.
 Scratch (voiced by Dana Snyder), a grumpy ghost cursed to be alongside Molly. While he isn't seen by any humans except the McGee family and Libby, his favorite member of the McGee family is Grandma Nin, because she sends him Thai snacks. His main hobby is making people miserable. His job is to scare people as assigned by the Ghost Council, but he seems to like spending his time being with Molly. Scratch glows a fluorescent cyan while visible, but is able to render himself invisible at will. He has a slimy appearance, though he is able to shift his appearance at will, as well as being able to distort his surroundings, typically to scare humans. He also has the ability to teleport between the Human Realm and the Ghost Realm at will. In "Out of House and Home/Home is Where the Haunt Is", after the McGees are forced to leave the house, they are no longer cursed together, but Scratch still stays with the McGees after they move back in. In the Season 1 finale, he is punished for befriending a human, until Molly (as a wraith) rescues him, overpowers the Flow of Failed Phantoms and disintegrates the Chairman.
 Pete McGee (voiced by Jordan Klepper), Molly's father. Pete married Sharon with an unofficial wedding. He tends to act dim-witted at times, but means well.
 Sharon McGee (voiced by Sumalee Montano), Molly's mother. Sharon married Pete with an unofficial wedding. She originally had a tense relationship with her mother, Grandma Nin, but they began to get along better, starting with "The Best of Nin-tensions". Her income comes from doing gigs from an app named Gig-Pig.
 Montano also voices Grandma Nin, Molly and Darryl's grandmother, Sharon’s mother and Pete's mother-in-law.
 Darryl McGee (voiced by Michaela Dietz), Molly's mischievous younger brother. Darryl has a pet tarantula named Heidi Hairylegs.

Recurring
Brighton citizens
 Libby Stein-Torres (voiced by Lara Jill Miller), Molly's best human friend. Libby has a love for turtles. She suffers from frequent slapstick comedy as she is shown to be rather unlucky. Libby hides her head in her turtleneck collar when she is nervous. She knows about historical people as they are people that passed away a long time ago. Libby was unaware of Scratch's presence until the episode "Scratch the Surface", when she learned about Scratch's existence, and later on, she became friends with him after they worked together to save Molly when she got trapped in a compost machine.
 Andrea Davenport (voiced by Jules Medcraft), Molly's arch-nemesis and occasional frenemy. She is very sensitive about how her first name is pronounced and she is the most popular girl at school. Despite her success, she seems unhappy at times, desperately craving the attention of her busy parents. In "Home is Where the Haunt Is", Andrea is shown to care about Molly, having started a fund to save the latter's family's house. It is also revealed in said episode that she sees Molly as her best friend.
 Sheela (voiced by Aparna Nancherla), Molly's geeky friend.
 Kat (voiced by Eden Riegel), Molly's sweet pink-haired friend.
 Miss Lightfoot (voiced by Julia Jones), Molly's constantly nervous teacher.
 Mrs. Roop (voiced by Jane Lynch), a teacher at Brighton Middle School. She has a wife, Pam, mentioned in "No Good Deed".
 Patty (voiced by Jenifer Lewis), an elder resident who quickly befriends Molly.
 Mayor Brunson (voiced by Patton Oswalt), Brighton's mayor.
 Leah Stein-Torres (voiced by Pamela Adlon), Libby's mother and friend. She is the "#1 fan" of her own daughter. Ms. Stein-Torres owns a bookstore called Book Marks the Spot.
 Principal O'Connor (voiced by Eugene Byrd), Brighton Middle School's principal.
 Irving the Illusionist (voiced by Trevor Devall), a street magician who gets a thrill out of bewildering any passerby who sees him with his sleight of hand which, so far, mainly involves cards, coins and confetti.
 Weird Larry (voiced by Trevor Devall), a pawn shop owner whose eccentric ways tend to freak out anybody on account that he tends to ask for help with the uncomfortable favors such as the time he needed help finding and catching his beloved runaway pet skunk Vera.
 Maxwell Davenport (voiced by Thomas Lennon), the owner of a local department store and Andrea’s father.
 Mrs. Davenport (voiced by Jessica Keenan Wynn), Maxwell's wife and Andrea's mother.
 Joanie Pataky (voiced by Grey Griffin), Brighton's news reporter.

Ghosts
 The Ghost Council: The Ghost Realm's council
 The Chairman, the main antagonist who is a ghostly chairman, representing the Grim Reaper. He feeds on misery, and expects other ghosts to spread it for him. He was destroyed alongside the Flow of Failed Phantoms by Molly's joy during the season one finale.
 The Barrister Ghosts, the secondary antagonists who are in charge of making sure ghosts in the world maintain their jobs of causing misery in their cities.
 Lucretia (voiced by Grey Griffin)
 Sir Alister (voiced by John DiMaggio)
 Grimbella (voiced by Kari Wahlgren)
 Bartholomew (voiced by Greg Baldwin)
 Geoff (voiced by Eric Edelstein), a goofy ghost who thinks he's friends with Scratch. His running gag is him spelling his name.
 Ghost Bouncer (voiced by John DiMaggio), the bouncer of the Haughty Hunts Club, a club that let ghosts in, if they're official members.
 Abraham Lincoln (voiced by Kelsey Grammer), the 16th U.S. president, nicknamed "Honest Abe".
 Ezekiel "Tug" Tugbottom (voiced by Chris Diamantopoulos), Sally's troublemaking younger brother, who took credit for her accomplishments until Molly, Libby and Scratch exposed the truth.
 Sally Tugbottom (voiced by Kerri Kenney-Silver), Brighton's founder and Ezekiel's older sister. Sally has a pet bear.
 Franklin Roosevelt (voiced by John DiMaggio), the 32nd U.S. president and Theodore Roosevelt's fifth cousin.
 Julius Caesar (voiced by Greg Baldwin), the Roman general and statesman.
 Cleopatra (voiced by Grey Griffin), the Egyptian queen of the Ptolemaic Kingdom.
 Jinx (voiced by Liza Koshy), a joy hunter sent by the Ghost Council to eliminate Molly.

Guest stars 
 Howlin' Harriet (voiced by Eden Riegel) appears in "Howlin' Harriet/The (Un)natural".
 Tammy Myers (voiced by Chandler Kinney) appears in "Howlin' Harriet/The (Un)natural".
 Kenny Star (voiced by Tom Kenny) appears in "Getting the Band(shell) Back Together/The Greatest Concert Ever".
 Greta Gerwig (voiced by herself) appears in "Mama's Gotta Hustle/Hooray for Mollywood!".
 Uncle Ted (voiced by Yuri Lowenthal) appears in "Mazel Tov, Libby!/No Good Deed".
 Eva Hernandez (voiced by Alanna Ubach) appears in "The Turnip Twist/All Systems No".
 Dianne (voiced by Yvette Nicole Brown) appears in "The Turnip Twist/All Systems No".
 Sonia Davis (voiced by Alanna Ubach) appears in "Ice Princess/Ready, Set, Snow!".
 Billy McGee (voiced by John DiMaggio) appears in "Innocent Until Proven Ghostly/Twin Trouble".
 Jilly McGee (voiced by Marieve Herington) appears in "Innocent Until Proven Ghostly/Twin Trouble".
 Sobgoblins (voiced by Grey Griffin) appear in "Innocent Until Proven Ghostly/Twin Trouble".
 Totes (voiced by Dee Bradley Baker) appears in "Goat Your Own Way/A Very Hungry Ghost".
 Pango (voiced by D'Arcy Carden) appears in "Scare Tactics/Bad Boy Bobby Daniels".
 Bobby Daniels (voiced by Danny Trejo) appears in "Scare Tactics/Bad Boy Bobby Daniels".
 Reggie (voiced by Sean Giambrone) appears in "Citizen McGee/The Internship".
 Candace Green (voiced by Natasha Rothwell) appears in "Out of House and Home/Home is Where the Haunt Is".
Upcoming guest stars include Tony Hale, Kimberly J. Brown, Lennon Parham, Vincent Rodriguez III, and Andrew Phung.

Others
 A neurodivergent/autistic female character whose name has not yet been revealed.

Production
The animated series was first conceived by co-creators Bill Motz and Bob Roth in 2007. The two of them had worked at Disney for years, with their first ever script being an episode of Darkwing Duck. At the time, the series was known as The Curse of Piper McGee and initially focused on the titular girl's family moving to Transylvania where she was cursed by a vampiric ghoul simply named the Count. This version of the show was initially first pitched to Nickelodeon who passed on it. After fourteen years, the duo had completed work on Lego Star Wars: The Freemaker Adventures when Disney signed them an overall deal. They re-pitched the series, with the new title of The Curse of Molly McGee, where it got a positive response this time.

On July 23, 2019, Disney Channel greenlit the series, which was to be produced by Disney Television Animation, and executive-produced by Motz, Roth, and Steve Loter. On September 24, 2020, Ashly Burch and Dana Snyder joined the series in its lead roles. The same day, the series was retitled The Ghost and Molly McGee.

The crew used several songs as inspiration from the series. Motz released a playlist featuring those songs throughout 2020 and part of 2021.

Music

The series' theme song was written by Allie Felder, Mike Kramer, Bill Motz and Bob Roth, and was performed by Ashly Burch and Dana Snyder. Songs for the series are written by Rob Cantor, with each episode featuring a musical sequence of approximately 1 minute. The show's score is done by Michael Kramer. An extended play album of some of the songs from the series was released on October 1, 2021.

Track listing

Episodes

Series overview

Season 1 (2021–22)

Season 2

Shorts

Chibi Tiny Tales (2021–22) 
Shortly after the series premiere, The Ghost and Molly McGee became the latest to join the Chibi Tiny Tales series.

Broken Karaoke (2021–22) 
Part of the Broken Karaoke series that was started by Big City Greens.

Theme Song Takeover (2022) 
As part of a promotional campaign, Disney Channel began airing the Disney Theme Song Takeover wherein supporting characters from different shows performed the theme song to the series they were in.

Release
The Ghost and Molly McGee premiered on Disney Channel on October 1, 2021. The first five episodes of the series were added to Disney+ on October 6, resulting in episodes 3-5 being released prior to their televised premieres.
The first episode was uploaded to YouTube on October 2, 2021. The second season will premiere on April 1, 2023, with the first five episodes of the season being released on Disney+ the following day.

Reception

Critical reception 
Kate Robertson of Stuff described the main characters as a pair forming an "unlikely friendship" who help each other evolve, describing Molly as "an optimist [...] who just wants to make the world a better place" and Scratch as a "pessimist who hopes for the worst," and stated that the series is "funny, charming and an all-round joy to watch." Ashley Moulton of Common Sense Media rated the series 4 out of 5 stars and depicted it as a "funny ghost-girl buddy story...[with] mild ghoulish scares." She also stated that younger kids will be spooked when ghosts transform, but older kids will not, stated that ghosts are "a bit rough around the edges" and there is some cartoon violence. However, she stated that human characters act in a more positive manner, stated that the show's protagonist, Molly, is a "great role model", compared the series to Monsters, Inc. but called it a "charming, sweetly spooky animated series."

Accolades

Notes

References

External links
 
 Production website
 

2021 American television series debuts
2020s American animated television series
American flash animated television series
Television series by Disney Television Animation
Disney Channel original programming
English-language television shows
Fictional duos
American children's animated adventure television series
American children's animated comedy television series
American children's animated fantasy television series
American children's animated horror television series
American children's animated musical television series
American children's animated supernatural television series
2020s American animated comedy television series
2020s American horror comedy television series
Asian-American television
Television series about ghosts
Animated television series about families
Television shows set in the Midwestern United States